A Student's Song of Heidelberg (German: Ein Burschenlied aus Heidelberg) is a 1930 German musical film directed by Karl Hartl and starring Hans Brausewetter, Betty Bird and Willi Forst. It marked Hartl's directoral debut. The film is in the tradition of the nostalgic Old Heidelberg.

It was shot at the Babelsberg Studios in Berlin. The film's sets were designed by the art director Robert Herlth.

Cast
 Hans Brausewetter as Bornemann jun 
 Betty Bird as Elinor Miller 
 Willi Forst as Robert Dahlberg 
 Ernst Stahl-Nachbaur as John Miller 
 Albert Paulig as Bornemann sen. 
 Carl Balhaus as Bornemanns Leibfuchs 
 Erwin Kalser as Dr. Zinker 
 Ida Wüst as Wirtin 
 Hermann Blaß as Sam Mayer 
 Paul Biensfeldt as Klubdiener 
 Ernst Behmer   
 Rudolf Biebrach   
 Julius E. Herrmann   
 Erich Kestin   
 Robert Klein-Lörk   
 Philipp Manning   
 Erik Ode   
 Karl Platen   
 Klaus Pohl   
 Ludwig Stössel   
 Bruno Ziener   
 Josef Bunzl   
 Peter Hoenselaers as Singer 
 Wolfgang Kuhle   
 Perponchez   
 Schneider   
 Wolfgang von Waltershausen   
 Max Zilzer

References

Bibliography
 Bock, Hans-Michael & Bergfelder, Tim. The Concise CineGraph. Encyclopedia of German Cinema. Berghahn Books, 2009.

External links

1930 films
Films of the Weimar Republic
1930 musical films
German musical films
1930s German-language films
Films directed by Karl Hartl
Films set in Heidelberg
Films with screenplays by Billy Wilder
UFA GmbH films
Films shot at Babelsberg Studios
German black-and-white films
1930s German films